The Jiabao V70 is a five- to eight-seater Microvan made by FAW Jilin under the Jiabao sub-brand.

Overview

The FAW Jiabao V70 was originally launched in 2009 and received several updates, including a second generation that is essentially the same model with no obvious visual changes.

The first generation Jiabao V70 update model sold from 2011 to 2012 was priced between 36,200 yuan and 48,800 yuan before discontinuation.

Launched in 2012, the second generation Jiabao V70 was powered by either a 1.0 liter Inline-four petrol engine or a 1.3 liter Inline-four petrol engine, with both engine passing the Euro IV emissions standard. The Jiabao V70 was priced between 34,900 yuan and 50,900 yuan before discontinuation.

References

External links
Official FAW website

Jiabao V70
Rear-wheel-drive vehicles
Microvans
Cars introduced in 2009
Cars of China
2010s cars